Arsalan Baiz (born 14 July 1950) is an Iraqi Kurdish politician of the Patriotic Union of Kurdistan.

Baiz was born in Erbil and graduated in Kurdish language from the University of Baghdad.

Baiz was made Speaker of the Parliament in February 2012, a role he retained until 2014.

References

1950 births
Living people
Iraqi Kurdistani politicians
Patriotic Union of Kurdistan politicians
Members of the Kurdistan Region Parliament
Speakers of the Kurdistan Region Parliament